Sarah Henstra is a Canadian writer and academic. A professor of English literature and creative writing at Toronto Metropolitan University (formerly Ryerson University). She is most noted for her 2018 novel The Red Word, which won the Governor General's Award for English-language fiction at the 2018 Governor General's Awards.

She previously published the young adult novel Mad Miss Mimic in 2015.

References

21st-century Canadian novelists
21st-century Canadian women writers
Canadian women novelists
Canadian writers of young adult literature
Academic staff of Toronto Metropolitan University
Writers from Toronto
Living people
Governor General's Award-winning fiction writers
Year of birth missing (living people)